Christopher Sharpless (born August 23, 1945) is a bobsledder who represented the United States Virgin Islands. He competed in the two man event at the 1988 Winter Olympics.

References

External links
 

1945 births
Living people
United States Virgin Islands male bobsledders
Olympic bobsledders of the United States Virgin Islands
Bobsledders at the 1988 Winter Olympics
People from Bryan, Texas